The Nebo-M or Nebo-ME (in Cyrillic: 55Ж6МЕ «Небо-МЕ», Nebo means "sky") also known as  RLM-ME or 55Zh6ME (export version) is an integrated multi-functional radar system that features a multiple programmable multi-band design radars and a central data fusion. The radar began to be investigated in 1984. The radar complex is made up of a command post module and one to three different radars which are deployed on separate 8x8 24-ton trucks. The manufacturer claims this radar system can detect 5th generation aircraft like the F-22 and F-35 and detect long-range ballistic missile launches. Nebo-ME is an export version with some degraded characteristics.

History

System design was initiated on a mobile chassis in 1999, after NATO countries attacked the Federal Republic of Yugoslavia, in which the stealth F-117 participated - one was shot down by S-125 Neva with help of P-18 radar - Russia started to perceive stealth aircraft as a possible future threat to their security. To counter that threat, they deemed that detection of such aircraft had to be made possible at greater ranges. Production started in 2010 and the system was tested on training grounds in 2011. It was publicly presented in 2012. In 2012-2013 deliveries started to the Russian Armed Forces.

Composition and description
As a system Nebo-M is a complex that features few different radars. Mainly from beginning Nebo-M represent modifications and modernization's of older VHF band Nebo SVU, the L-band Protivnik G and the S/X-band Gamma S1 on mobile chassis called in their newer variants RLM-S, RLM-D, RLM-M and command post KU-RLK.  The whole system with maximum number of radars can be deployed in 40 minutes. At minimum deployment with one radar it can not achieve all maximum ranges for detection of all types of air objects but can trace so called stealth aircraft's if deployed RLM-M. All radars from Nebo-M system can be used separately for independent deployment or as pairs in deployments.

Nebo-M can exchange observed information with antiaircraft missile systems like Pantsir missile system, S-300 and S-400 or others in order to guide them towards threats.

RLM-M (in Cyrillic: «РЛМ-М» «РЛС метрового диапазона») or 55Zh6UME (export version RLM-ME) or Nebo-U and modernized variant Nebo-UM is 3-D VHF and UHF acquisition radar and main component of Nebo-M system. It is the successor to the old 1L13 Nebo “Box Spring” radar and is easy to distinguish from it since the direction of polarization is vertical rather than horizontal.

RLM-D (in Cyrillic: «РЛМ-Д» «РЛС дециметрового диапазона») or 55Zh6ME (export version RLM-DE) is L-band active electronically scanned array (AESA) mobile radar system designed based on older Protivnik G radar with task to conduct air surveillance on chassis of БАЗ-6909-015.
 

RLM-S (in Cyrillic: «РЛМ-С» «РЛС сантиметрового диапазона») or in export version RLM-SE also known as GAMMA-S is X-band active electronically scanned array (AESA) mobile radar system based on older Gamma S1 64Л6 radar designed to conduct air surveillance on chassis of БАЗ-6909-015.

KU-RLK (in Cyrillic: «КУ РЛК») is command posts that fuses all information's from different types of radar in single radar picture. It is based on older Fundament-1E command post and is on БАЗ-6909-015 chassis.

Operational deployments

First two Nebo-M regiments were deployed in 2017 to Saint Petersburg and Kareliya. In 2018, further two regiments were deployed to Crimea and Penza. In 2019, a regiment was delivered to Volga region. In 2020, two regiments were deployed to the Far East and Naryan Mar.

Another modernization of Nebo radar, Nebo-UM, that is a mobile 3D radar that works in meter range only, is being delivered to the air force since 2018. In 2018, a regiment was delivered to Voronezh and Novosibirsk and in 2020 to Rostov-on-Don. It's a complement to Rezonans-NE fixed meter-range radars, that have been constructed in the Arctic in Zapolyarniy, Indiga, Shoyna and Nova Zemlya, with another in Gremikha under construction.

Other sources report deliveries of Nebo-M and Nebo-UM radars already in 2015 to Eastern military district.

Different components of Nebo-M were deployed in Syria where they were used to track among others F-35 and F-22.

Operators

References 

Russian and Soviet military radars